Trillium simile, the jeweled wakerobin, is a spring-flowering perennial plant which is native to southern parts of the Appalachian Mountains in southeastern United States (Tennessee, Georgia, North and South Carolina). It is also known as sweet white wake-robin, sweet white trillium and confusing trillium.

Trillium simile prefers to grow in moist humus-rich soils in mature forests at the edges of Rhododendron thickets and at edges of the forest.  It is found at elevations of 500 – 700 meters (1,640 - 2,300 feet).

Taxonomy
Trillium simile was described by Henry A. Gleason in 1906.

Bibliography

References

External links 
 
 

simile
Flora of the Southeastern United States
Flora of the Appalachian Mountains
Plants described in 1906